Mario Losada Laguna (born 13 May 1997) is a Spanish footballer who plays for Las Rozas as a forward.

Club career
Losada was born in Madrid, and finished his formation with Rayo Vallecano. On 16 August 2016, he joined Tercera División side CF Trival Valderas, and made his senior debut for the club twelve days later by coming on as a substitute and scoring the equalizer in a 1–1 home draw against Alcobendas CF.

On 18 February 2018, Losada scored a hat-trick in a 5–1 away routing of CP Parla Escuela. On 15 July, after finishing the campaign with 14 goals, he joined AD Alcorcón and was initially assigned  to the reserves also in the fourth tier.

Losada made his first team debut on 1 June 2019, replacing Borja Galán in a 0–1 home loss against Gimnàstic de Tarragona in the Segunda División championship.

References

External links
 Mario Losada at AD Alcorcón 
 
 
 

1997 births
Living people
Footballers from Madrid
Spanish footballers
Association football forwards
Segunda División players
Tercera División players
CF Trival Valderas players
AD Alcorcón B players
AD Alcorcón footballers
Deportivo Fabril players
Las Rozas CF players